In Rome's early semi-legendary history, Tarquinia was the daughter of Lucius Tarquinius Priscus, the fifth king of Rome, (and either sister or aunt to Rome's seventh and final king, Lucius Tarquinius Superbus). Her father, Lucius Tarquinius Priscus, gave her in marriage to Servius Tullius, the sixth king of Rome. She was the mother of Lucius Junius Brutus, who overthrew the monarchy and became one of Rome's first consuls in 509 BC. She had another son, who was put to death by Superbus after he took the Roman rule from Servius.

Ancient sources
The main literary sources for Tarquinia's life are the Roman Historian Livy's (59 BC - AD 17) Ab urbe condita and Dionysius of Halicarnassus's (60 BC - after 7 BC) Roman Antiquities. 

Livy mentioned Tarquinia once in book one of Ab urbe condita, when describing the lineage of her son Lucius Junius Brutus.

Dionysius of Halicarnassus cited Tarquinia in Roman Antiquities three times. The first reference describes how Servius Tullius had two daughters with Tarquinia, whom Lucius Tarquinius Priscus gave to in marriage. Tarquinia was mentioned again with describing Marcus Junius Brutus, with Tarquinia being cited as a daughter of the first Tarquin king Lucius Tarquinius Priscus. A third reference to Tarquinia describes her mourning after the gruesome assassination of Servius Tullius, where he was thrown down the steps of the senate-house and murdered in the street by Lucius Tarquinius Superbus' men. His daughter Tullia, wife of Superbus, drove her chariot over her father's dead body. Tarquinia is described as always showing great kindness to her late husband and incredibly unhappy that she was not allowed to mourn her husband and unable to perform customary sacrifices to him. Servius Tullius was not allowed a proper burial by Superbus, citing that even Romulus died without sepulture. This refusal to permit his father-in-law's burial earned Lucius Tarquinius the cognomen Superbus (meaning arrogant or proud).

Historical controversy

Lucius Tarquinius Priscus had two daughters, both of whom are referred to as Tarquinia. Servius Tullius married one daughter, called Tarquinia I. The other daughter, Tarquinia II, who was assumed to be mentioned by Livy and Dionysius of Halicarnassus married Marcus Junius and by whom she is the mother of Lucius Junius Brutus.  This family lineage is proper in Livy, as he puts Brutus in second generation after Priscus. 

The lineage does not coincide with another source, Dionysius of Halicarnassus, who has put Brutus in the third generation after Priscus, meaning Tarquinia would be the grandmother of Brutus, or must be a grandchild of Priscus. This lineage pushes Tarquinia a generation down from Priscus. 

On the assumption that Tarquinia is sister to Superbus, we do not know who Tarquinia II married, nor anything about her descendants.

Popular culture 
Tarquinia is a character in notable plays by John Howard Payne, and Richard Cumberland.

References

Livy, Ab urbe condita, 1.49, 1.56
Dionysius of Halicarnassus, Roman Antiquities 4.28, 4.68, 4.79

Bibliography
 Gantz, Timothy Nolan. "The Tarquin Dynasty." Historia: Zeitschrift für Alte Geschichte H. 4 (1975): 539-554.
 Mirković, Miroslava. "Missing persons in early Roman history, kinship and power." BIG 3 (2012): 9-24

6th-century BC Roman women
Tarquinii
Daughters of Roman kings